Grande-Anse is a quartier of Terre-de-Haut Island, located in Îles des Saintes archipelago in the Caribbean. It is located in the eastern part of the island. The cemetery and the airport's terminal of Terre-de-Haut Island are located on this village. It is also the largest beach of the island. The fire department station is inside the airport area. Lot of rental cottage are present in Grande-Anse.

To See
"Grande Anse" beach: A long gold sand beaches, agitated because of its location exposed to the Trade wind. It is frequented by surfers.
The cemetery: It a catholic cemetery with white graves and black crucifix. Conch shells decorate some of the graves.

Notes  

Populated places in Îles des Saintes
Quartiers of Îles des Saintes